East Lynne is a 1922 Australian silent film directed by actor and exhibitor Charles Hardy. It was a modern-day adaptation of the famous 1861 novel which had been filmed many times in England and the USA.

It is considered a lost film.

Plot
Married Isobel Vane is told by Sir Francis Levison that her husband Richard has been unfaithful. Levison seduces Isobel, but then abandons her. Isobel returns home after years away only to find out that Richard had assumed she was dead and has remarried. She pretends to be a nurse and saves the life of one of her own children. She falls ill, is recognised by Richard, but dies.

Cast
Ethel Jerdan
Don McAlpine as Archibald Carlyle
Hazel Stewart as Lady Isobel

Production
Charles Hardy had worked in Australian films as an exhibitor and actor. The film was shot on location in Vaucluse, Sydney and in a studio at the Sydney Showground in early 1922.

Reception
The film previewed in May but was not released until several months later. It was a big failure at the box-office. Hardy went on to work for Selznick Pictures as their Australian manager.

References

External links

1922 films
Australian drama films
Australian silent feature films
Australian black-and-white films
Lost Australian films
1922 drama films
1922 lost films
Lost drama films
Silent drama films